Caledonia Spirits is a craft distillery in Montpelier, Vermont. The distillery is known for its Barr Hill-brand spirits, including gin, vodka, and an Old Tom gin called Tom Cat. The company's flagship product is its Barr Hill Gin, which is the top-selling Vermont-made spirit and the most awarded gin made in the US.

History
The distillery was originally located in Hardwick in Vermont's Caledonia County (in the Northeast Kingdom). It was founded by Todd Hardie, a lifelong beekeeper who wanted to popularize honey-based beverages and highlight the important and threatened role of bees in the environment. Ryan Christiansen serves as the company's president and head distiller. The two met in 2011, while Hardie was using raw honey in his small production winery at the time. In the 2010s, the company moved to Montpelier, opening a 27,000-square-foot distillery. In 2019, the company expanded its presence there, opening a cocktail bar and retail store.

Operations
The distillery distributes in 32 U.S. states, as well as Montreal, and other foreign cities with cocktail cultures. Product volume tripled from 2015 to 2019 and continues to grow rapidly, leading to about 60,000 4.5L cases shipped per year.

Each year since 2017, Caledonia Spirits has hosted a Bee's Knees Week, an event to raise funds to plant pollinator habitats across the U.S. The event, hosted in late September each year, is an effort to combat pollinator decline. The 2021 fundraiser had a goal of planting  of bee habitats.

Products
The company's Barr Hill Gin uses raw honey sourced from Vermont. The raw honey maintains aromatics from the bees' foraging practices, with an estimated 100 to 115 different pollen and plant particles found in their raw honey.

The company's vodka is distilled from only raw honey sourced from a 250-mile radius around the Barr Hill distillery. The process requires  of honey per 750 mL bottle. The honey is not heated prior to fermentation, preserving natural aromatics. The vodka is also distilled only one to two times, keeping flavors that could otherwise be removed through subsequent distillations.

Reception
Caledonia Spirits' gin is well-received. In a Forbes review of top gins in 2019, Barr Hill was listed first, recommended for its botanical notes and for use in a white Negroni.

References

External links
 

Montpelier, Vermont
Distilleries in the United States
Privately held companies based in Vermont
Food and drink companies based in Vermont
Manufacturing companies based in Vermont
Food and drink companies established in 2011
American vodkas
Gins
Hardwick, Vermont